Kimberley Ann Deal (born June 10, 1961) is an American singer-songwriter and multi-instrumentalist. She was the bassist and the co-vocalist in the alternative rock band Pixies, before forming the Breeders in 1989.

Deal joined Pixies in January 1986, adopting the stage name Mrs. John Murphy for the albums Come on Pilgrim and Surfer Rosa. Following Doolittle and the Pixies' hiatus, she formed the Breeders with Tanya Donelly, Josephine Wiggs, and Britt Walford. Following the band's debut album Pod, her twin sister Kelley Deal joined, replacing Tanya Donelly.

Pixies broke up in early 1993, and Deal returned her focus to the Breeders, who released the platinum-selling album Last Splash in 1993, with the single "Cannonball". In 1994, the Breeders went into hiatus after Deal's sister Kelley entered drug rehabilitation. During the band's hiatus, Deal adopted the stage name Tammy Ampersand and formed the short-lived rock band the Amps, recording a single album, Pacer, in 1995. After her own stint in drug rehabilitation, Deal eventually reformed the Breeders with a new line-up for two more albums, Title TK in 2002 and Mountain Battles in 2008. During that time, she would also return to Pixies when the band reunited in 2004. In 2013, Deal announced she was leaving Pixies to concentrate on making new material with the Breeders, after the band's most famous line-up (Wiggs and Jim Macpherson had rejoined the band for the first time since 1995) had reunited for a new series of tours celebrating the 20th anniversary of the band's hit album Last Splash.

In 2018, the Breeders released their fifth album All Nerve, the first album to reunite the Deals, Wiggs, and Macpherson since the release of 1993's Last Splash.

Early life 
Deal was born in Dayton, Ohio, United States. Her father was a laser physicist who worked at the nearby Wright-Patterson Air Force Base. Kim and her identical twin sister Kelley were introduced to music at a young age; the two sang to a "two-track, quarter-inch, tape" when they were "four or five" years old, and grew up listening to hard rock bands such as AC/DC and Led Zeppelin. When Deal was 11, she learned Roger Miller's "King of the Road" on the acoustic guitar. In high school, at Wayne High School in Huber Heights, she was a cheerleader and often got into conflicts with authority. "We were popular girls," Kelley explained. "We got good grades and played sports." Still, growing up in Dayton was "like living in Russia", according to Deal. A friend of Kelley's living in California used to send them cassettes of artists like James Blood Ulmer, the Undertones, Elvis Costello, Sex Pistols and Siouxsie and the Banshees. "These tapes were our most treasured possession, the only link with civilization."

As a teenager, she formed a folk rock band with her sister. She then became a prolific songwriter, as she found it easier to write songs than cover them. Deal later commented on her songwriting output: "I got like a hundred songs when I was like 16, 17 ... The music is pretty good, but the lyrics are just like, OH MY GOD. We were just trying to figure out how blue rhymes with you. When I was writing them, they didn't have anything to do with who I was." The Deals bought microphones, an eight-track tape recorder, a mixer, speakers, and amps for a bedroom studio. According to Kelley, they "had the whole thing set up by the time we were 17." They later bought a drum machine "so it would feel like we were more in a band."

Following high school, Deal went to seven different colleges, including Ohio State University, but did not graduate from any of them. She eventually earned an associate degree in medical technology from Kettering College of Medical Arts and took several jobs in cellular biology, including working in a hospital laboratory and a biochemical lab.

Musical career

Pixies 

Deal became the bassist and backing vocalist for the Pixies in January 1986, after answering an advertisement in the Boston Phoenix that read, "Band seeks bassist into Hüsker Dü and Peter, Paul and Mary. Please – no chops." Deal was the only person to call them, even though her main instrument was guitar. She borrowed her sister Kelley's bass guitar to use in the band. To complete the lineup, she suggested they hire David Lovering as drummer, a friend of her husband, whom she met at her wedding reception. For the release of the band's first recording Come on Pilgrim (1987), Deal used the nom de disque "Mrs. John Murphy" in the liner notes. She chose the name as an ironic feminist joke, after conversing with a lady who wished to be called only by her husband's name as a form of respect.

For Surfer Rosa (1988), Deal sang lead vocals on the album's only single, "Gigantic", which she co-wrote with Black Francis. Doolittle followed a year later, with Deal contributing the song "Silver" and appearing on slide guitar. By this time, however, tensions began to develop between her and Francis, with bickering and standoffs between the two marring the album's recording sessions. This led to increased stress between the band members. Deal commented that during the sessions, it "went from just all fun to work". Exhaustion from releasing three records in two years and constant touring contributed to the friction, particularly between Francis and Deal.

The tension and exhaustion culminated at the end of the US "Fuck or Fight" tour, where they were too tired to attend the end-of-tour party. The band soon announced a hiatus.

The Breeders and Pod 

During a 1988 post-Surfer Rosa tour of Europe with Throwing Muses as part of the Pixies, Deal began to write new material. As neither band had plans for the short term, Deal discussed possible side-projects with Throwing Muses guitarist Tanya Donnelly. After rejecting the idea of creating a dance album together, the pair decided to form a new band. Deal named the band the Breeders, after the folk band she formed with Kelley as a teenager, and they recruited Carrie Bradley, violinist and vocalist in Ed's Redeeming Qualities, to record a short demo tape.

The Breeders' demo was sent to 4AD head Ivo Watts-Russell, who immediately signed them to the label. The Breeders allowed Deal to become more active in songwriting, and their debut album, Pod (1990), containing mostly Deal-written songs, was recorded in Edinburgh by Steve Albini. Pod, and especially Deal's contribution, was praised by contemporaries; Nirvana frontman Kurt Cobain later named the album one of his favorites and remarked: "I wish Kim was allowed to write more songs for the Pixies."

Bossanova and Trompe le Monde 
Deal returned to the U.S. after finishing recording Pod in Edinburgh, but was then fired from the Pixies. Regardless, she flew out to Los Angeles to meet with the band and the other members changed their mind and the four of them began recording the band's next album, Bossanova (1990).

The band's final studio album was Trompe le Monde (1991). The recording sessions were fractious, as the band were hardly ever together during the process.

She rarely sang on the band's songs during this time; one of the few tracks she sang on was a cover of Neil Young's "I've Been Waiting for You". However, Deal did sing on Trompe le Monde, on songs such as "Alec Eiffel", but did not write any material for the album.

Last Splash and the Breeders 
A year after the Pixies' breakup, Deal's identical twin sister Kelley joined the Breeders on lead guitar and the band released its second album, Last Splash, to critical acclaim and considerable commercial success. The record went platinum within a year of its release.

At the height of the Breeders' popularity in the early-mid 1990s, the band scored a number of hit music videos featured heavily on MTV, including "Cannonball", "Safari", "Divine Hammer", and "Saints." The band also released the vinyl-only "Head to Toe" 10" EP during the summer of 1994, when they appeared on the main stage of Lollapalooza. Although the band went into stasis in 1994 when Kelley Deal entered rehab for a heroin addiction, they never officially split up, and in 2002 released Title TK (TK is a copyediting mark meaning "to come" and is often used when editing drafts to indicate missing information).

The Amps and other projects 
During this eight-year hiatus, Deal kept busy by forming, recording, and touring with the Amps.

After a few gigs where Deal went by the moniker Tammy Ampersand, The Amps released their single LP, Pacer. The record had an enthusiastic reception from reviewers, but was commercially unsuccessful.

She also produced music for other groups, most notably fellow Dayton band Guided by Voices (one of the songs on Pacer, "I Am Decided", was written by the band's lead singer, Robert Pollard).

Deal has contributed her voice to numerous projects, including This Mortal Coil's 1991 version of Chris Bell's "You and Your Sister" (a duet with Tanya Donnelly); the 1995 Sonic Youth single "Little Trouble Girl"; and the For Carnation's "Tales (Live from the Crypt)" in 2000.

Pixies reunion and beyond 

In 2004, Deal returned to a newly reunited Pixies and toured North America with them. The song "Bam Thwok" was also released that year. One notable performance included a live taping for the public television program Austin City Limits in October 2004. The Pixies also played the Coachella Festival in 2004 and headlined Lollapalooza in 2005 at Chicago's Grant Park. The Pixies also toured the UK to critical acclaim including a headline appearance at the Reading and Leeds Festivals.

In 2003, Deal moved back to her hometown of Dayton to care for her mother who was diagnosed with Alzheimer's disease. In early April 2008, the Breeders released their fourth full-length studio album, Mountain Battles. In April 2009, the Breeders released their third EP, Fate to Fatal. On June 14, 2013, it was announced that Deal had left the Pixies. She has since posted new solo music on her website. , she has no relationship with her former bandmates in Pixies.

Solo releases, LSXX, and All Nerve 
In December 2012, Deal played a solo set at the All Tomorrow's Parties "Nightmare Before Christmas" festival in the UK, debuting several new songs. At the same time, she released her first solo single, "Walking with a Killer", and continued to issue further solo releases throughout 2013 and 2014.

In April 2013, 4AD released LSXX, a 20th anniversary edition of the Breeders album Last Splash. Deal reunited with Kelley Deal, Josephine Wiggs, and Jim Macpherson for a Last Splash anniversary tour of North America, Europe, and Australia. In August 2014, it was reported that the same line up were working on new material.

A new single, "Wait in the Car", was released on October 3, 2017. On March 2, 2018, the reunited lineup released All Nerve, their first studio album in ten years, to widespread critical acclaim. In the following months, the Breeders also collaborated on multiple tracks of Courtney Barnett's May 2018 album Tell Me How You Really Feel, with Kim and Kelley singing backing vocals on the singles "Nameless, Faceless" and "Crippling Self-Doubt and a General Lack of Confidence".

Discography

Pixies 
 Come on Pilgrim (EP, 1987)
 Surfer Rosa (1988)
 Doolittle (1989)
 Bossanova (1990)
 Trompe le Monde (1991)

The Breeders 
 Pod (1990)
 Safari (EP, 1992)
 Last Splash (1993)
 Live in Stockholm 1994 (Live album, 1994)
 Head to Toe (EP, 1994)
 Title TK (2002)
 Mountain Battles (2008)
 Fate to Fatal (EP, 2009)
 All Nerve (2018)

The Amps 
 Pacer (1995)

Solo 7" single series 
 "Walking with a Killer" b/w "Dirty Hessians" (2012)
 "Hot Shot" b/w "Likkle More" (2013)
 "Are You Mine?" b/w "Wish I Was" (2013)
 "The Root" b/w "Range On Castle" (2014)
 "Biker Gone" b/w "Beautiful Moon Clear" (2014)

Equipment

Bass guitars 
Kim Deal generally plays four-string solid-body bass guitars and always uses a pick, particularly the "green Dunlops with the little turtle on them", although since the Pixies' reunion she has also been using custom green Dunlops with "KIM" written on them. She prefers having old strings on a bass.
 Aria Pro II Cardinal Series – The Pixies' first bass belonged to Kelley, and is heard on Come on Pilgrim, Surfer Rosa and seen on the Town & Country live video. It later reappeared in the Kelley Deal 6000.
 1962 Fender Precision Reissue – Acquired for use on Doolittle on Gil Norton's insistence. It appears in the video for "Here Comes Your Man". On the Bossanova album, the Precision was used on "Dig for Fire" for its "lazier, growlier sound" that was "not as boingy-boingy-sproingy".
 Music Man StingRay – Added in time for Bossanova "because it was active and had a different sound" and became her main live bass "because it was a little less country-sounding than the Fender". The instrument was afterwards played by Josephine Wiggs in the Breeders, and by Luis Lerma in the Amps.
 Steinberger headless (but full-bodied, two-cutaway) bass – Bought during the recording of Trompe Le Monde because the other basses were out of tune on the higher frets. Deal described it as having a "weird, organ-y sound".
 Gibson Thunderbird – more recently, her favorite bass that she did not use on the Pixies' reunion, feeling she had to "sound like the records". It is seen played upside-down (left-handed) by Mando Lopez in the Breeders, and by Kim Deal herself in the video for "Biker Gone" (2014).

Guitars 
When playing acoustic guitars for rhythm, Kim Deal prefers distorting their sound through Marshall amps, particularly liking the resulting low end. She also pointed out that it almost does not depend on the acoustic guitar used.
 Seagull acoustic
 1958 Gibson Les Paul Goldtop Reissue – Also played by Joey Santiago up through Surfer Rosa (before he acquired his own) and then by Kelley Deal in the Breeders.
 Fender Stratocaster – The particular model Deal plays is a 1991 Strat Ultra. Kelley Deal also has the same model, which she received as a Christmas present from her sister in 1991.
 Fender Telecaster has occasionally been played by Kim in the Breeders' live performances since at least the Last Splash era. She was also shown using the guitar on the tourbus in the Pixies documentary film loudQUIETloud (2006).
 Gibson hollowbody – Borrowed for use on Last Splash.

Amplification 
 Peavey 300 Combo, 1×15" speaker
 Trace Elliot bass head – Deal said of the amp: "It's the new series and I don't know what the number is or if there even is a number on there."
 Trace Elliot 1048H bass cabinet, 4×10" speakers
 SWR heads
 Marshall JCM 900 head
 Marshall cabinets
 Gallien-Krueger cabinet, 4×10" speakers
 "Joe's Light" cabinet, 1×18" speaker – Of this and the Gallien-Krueger she commented: "I hate my cabinets."
 Sears Tremolo amp with the word 'Marshall' pasted on it.

Effects 
 dbx 160X Compressor – "I use a compressor live, but only because sound guys seem to like it when I have one onstage, even if it's on bypass."
 Boss DS-1 Distortion pedals – Used by both Kim and Kelley.

Recording 
Kim Deal uses the "All Wave" philosophy of recording, using no computers, no digital recording, no auto-tuning, nor any other mainstays of contemporary production. The philosophy carries through the entire production and mastering process, including mixing, editing, sequencing, post-production and the exceptional step of an all-analog direct-metal master for the vinyl LP. This process was used on the Breeders' Title TK, the Off You EP, and Mountain Battles.

Deal commissioned the All Wave logo in an effort to identify recordings that follow this method of recording, and possibly start a movement.

Personal life 
When asked if she had a "gay bone" in her body, Deal responded with "You know what?  I'm just so… asexual, I wish I had a gay bone."

References

Notes

Bibliography

External links 

 
 The Breeders
 [ Kim Deal] at AllMusic
 

1961 births
4AD artists
American atheists
American women singer-songwriters
American rock bass guitarists
American rock drummers
 Asexual women
Identical twins
American experimental musicians
American indie rock musicians
Living people
Singer-songwriters from Ohio
Musicians from Dayton, Ohio
Pixies (band) members
The Breeders members
American women rock singers
Women bass guitarists
Noise rock musicians
Slide guitarists
American alternative rock musicians
American twins
Alternative rock bass guitarists
Alternative rock singers
People from Huber Heights, Ohio
Twin musicians
Guitarists from Ohio
21st-century American women singers
20th-century American bass guitarists
21st-century American singers
20th-century American women guitarists